Natalya Viktorovna Sipchenko (born 1947) is a retired Russian swimmer who won a gold medal in the 4×100 m freestyle relay at the 1966 European Aquatics Championships, setting a new European record. She won a national title in the same event in 1965.

References

1947 births
Living people
Russian female freestyle swimmers
Soviet female swimmers
European Aquatics Championships medalists in swimming
Swimmers from Saint Petersburg